Cham-e Sobbi (also Romanized as Cham-e Şobbī and Cham Şabī) is a village in Abdoliyeh-ye Sharqi Rural District, in the Central District of Ramshir County, Khuzestan Province, Iran. At the 2006 census, its population was 292, in 61 families.

References 

Populated places in Ramshir County